The 2004 North Carolina gubernatorial election was held on November 2, 2004.  The general election was between the Democratic incumbent Mike Easley and the Republican nominee Patrick J. Ballantine. Easley won by 56% to 43%, winning his second term as governor. This is the last time a Democrat was elected governor of North Carolina by double digits.

Primaries

Democratic
Mike Easley was first elected as governor in 2000 and opted to run for a second term. He faced opposition in the Democratic primary from Rickey Kipfer, a former corporate manager from Lee County. Kipfer campaigned on a platform of abolishing North Carolina's personal income tax and exploring potential natural gas resources in the state. He envisioned the state replacing income tax revenue with revenue from natural gas exploration. Kipfer also proposed a system similar to the Alaska Permanent Fund as a means of distributing potential natural gas revenues to citizens in North Carolina.

Easley's campaign manager stated that they did not consider Kipfer as serious competition. Easley did not campaign against Kipfer.

Mike Easley won the primary comfortably with over 85% of the vote.

Candidates

Declared
Mike Easley, incumbent governor
Rickey Kipfer, businessman

Results

Republican

Candidates

Declared
Patrick J. Ballantine, Minority Leader of the North Carolina Senate (1999-2004)
Dan Barett, attorney and Davie County Commissioner
Bill Cobey, Chair of the North Carolina Republican Party (1999-2003) and U.S. Representative from NC-04 (1985-1987)
George Little, insurance executive
Fern Shubert, state senator (2003-2005)
Richard Vinroot, Mayor of Charlotte (1991-1995), nominee for governor in 2000 and candidate for governor in 1996

Withdrawn
Timothy Cook, chemist (running for lieutenant governor)

Declined
James Cain, former president of the Carolina Hurricanes
I. Beverly Lake Jr., Chief Justice of the North Carolina Supreme Court (2001-2006)

Results

General election

Predictions

Polling

Results

Notes

References

External links
2004 Gubernatorial Republican Primary Election Results

Official campaign websites (Archived)
Mike Easley
Patrick Ballantine
Dan Barrett
Bill Cobey
George Little
Fern Shubert
Richard Vinroot
Tim Cook 

North Carolina
2004
gubernatorial